Lewis Moist (26 January 1881 – 14 April 1940) was a British swimmer. He competed in the men's 1500 metre freestyle event at the 1908 Summer Olympics.

References

1881 births
1940 deaths
British male swimmers
Olympic swimmers of Great Britain
Swimmers at the 1908 Summer Olympics
Sportspeople from Birmingham, West Midlands
British male freestyle swimmers